Port Blair Islands are a group of islands situated in the sound of the capital Port Blair of the Andaman Islands. They belong to the South Andaman administrative district, part of the Indian union territory of Andaman and Nicobar Islands.

History
see Chatham Saw Mill.

Geography
The islands are located on North Bay, Navy Bay, Flat Bay, Garacharma Bay, and the vicinity of Netaji Subhas Chandra Bose Island.

Administration
Politically, Port Blair Islands are part of Port Blair Taluk.

Demographics
There are living quarters for the JPC manager at Chatham Island and several navy officers at the INS Jarawa quarters at Netaji Subhas Chandra Bose Island.

References 

Islands of the Andaman and Nicobar Islands
Archipelagoes of the Andaman and Nicobar Islands